The Epiphone Les Paul 100 (LP-100) is a solid body electric guitar first produced in 1993 and is based on the Gibson Les Paul. This budget priced, Gibson-authorized version of the Les Paul model, originally introduced with a carved maple top by Jim "Epi" Rosenberg at NAMM 1993, is made as a guitar with beginner and value minded consumers in mind.
The Les Paul 100 is outwardly very similar to the original Les Pauls. It has a traditionally shaped, single cut mahogany body, thinner than most Les Paul models, with two tone controls, two volume controls and the three position Rhythm/Treble switch. It also sports a stopbar tailpiece and Tune-o-matic bridge, like the higher end models.

The main difference with the Les Pauls is the guitar's mahogany bolt-on neck, as opposed to the set-in neck normally found on Les Pauls and other Gibson guitars. The fingerboard also sports dot inlays instead of the Les Paul's Trapezoid inlays.

The LP-100 currently comes with open coil 700T & 650R Ceramic humbucker pickups.

There have been several variations of the LP-100 model, Including the LP-100 Studio, Standard (Japan), Studio-Standard (flame-top) and Deluxe (gold hardware).

Les Paul 300
Also in this range of instruments was the LP-300. The LP-300 and LP-300 Standard ran alongside of the LP-100 and began production at the same time. The LP-300 was a slightly upscale version of the LP-100. The main differences between the LP-100 and LP-300 were the body woods and fingerboard inlays. The LP-300 had a laminated maple body and block inlays. The LP-300 Standard also had a laminated maple body, but trapezoid inlays. The LP-300 was produced from 1989-1992 and was available in a Starter Pack. The Standard version was produced from 1991-1997.

References
 Epiphone Technical Support, used as reference.

External links
 Epiphone LP-100

Les Paul 100